This page includes the discography of Greek singer Katy Garbi.

Starting in 1989 with her first album, Garbi has released 20 albums in total along with several compilations, live albums and CD singles. Garbi has sold over 2 million copies and she is among the most well known singers in Greece. In the 1990s, Garbi was first in sales for female singers in Greece. Her albums Arhizo Polemo and Evaisthiseis both achieved multi-platinum status and are among the top 10 selling CDs of the 1990s, while her album To Kati (4× Platinum) was one of the best selling CDs in the 2000s.

Studio albums
* denotes unknown or unavailable information.

Live albums
* denotes unknown or unavailable information.

Official compilations
* denotes unknown or unavailable information.

EPs
* denotes unknown or unavailable information.

Note: Singles without chart positions may have charted but there is no information currently available.

Singles
Note: This list includes CD singles and digital downloads

Soundtracks

Videography

Collaborations

References

Discographies of Greek artists
Pop music discographies
Discography